Aisya Eleesa (born 24 October 2002) is a Malaysian cricketer. In August 2018, at the age of 15 years, she made her T20I debut against Singapore. In October 2022, she played a few T20Is against Test playing teams in Women's Asia Cup.

References

External links
 

2002 births
Living people
Malaysian women cricketers
Malaysia women Twenty20 International cricketers